Jacques-Maurice Couve de Murville (24 January 1907 – 24 December 1999) was a French diplomat and politician who was Minister of Foreign Affairs from 1958 to 1968 and Prime Minister from 1968 to 1969 under the presidency of General de Gaulle. As foreign minister he played the leading role in the critical Franco-German treaty of cooperation in 1963, he laid the foundation for the Paris-Bonn axis that was central in building a united Europe.

Life
He was born Maurice Couve (his father acquired the name de Murville in 1925) in Reims. Maurice Couve de Murville, the Roman Catholic Archbishop of Birmingham (1929–2007), was his cousin.

Couve de Murville joined the corps of finance inspectors in 1930, and in 1940 became Director of External Finances of the Vichy régime, in which capacity he sat at the armistice council of Wiesbaden. In March 1943, after the American landing in North Africa, he was one of the few senior officials of Vichy to join the Free French. He left for Algiers, via Spain, where he joined General Henri Giraud. On 7 June 1943, he was named commissioner of finance of the French Committee of National Liberation (CFLN). A few months later, he joined General Charles de Gaulle. In February 1945, he became a member of the Provisional Government of the French Republic (GPRF) with the rank of ambassador attached to the Italian government.

After the war, he occupied several posts as French Ambassador, in Cairo (1950 to 1954), at NATO (1954), in Washington (1955 to 1956) and in Bonn (1956 to 1958). When General de Gaulle returned to power in 1958, he became Foreign Minister, a post he retained for ten years until the reshuffle that followed the events of May 1968 where he replaced Finance minister Michel Debré, keeping this post only a short time: very soon after the elections, he became a transitional Prime Minister, replacing Georges Pompidou. The following year he was succeeded by Jacques Chaban-Delmas.

Couve de Murville continued his political career first as a UDR deputy, then RPR deputy for Paris until 1986, then as a senator until 1995. He died in Paris at the age of 92 from natural causes.

Published works
 Une politique étrangère, 1958–1969 (1971). ISBN unknown
 Le Monde en face (1989).

Political career

Governmental functions

Prime minister : 1968–1969

Minister of Foreign Affairs : 1958–1968

Minister of Economy and Finance : May–July 1968

Chairman of the Foreign Affairs Committee of the National Assembly 1973–1981.

Electoral mandates

Member of the National Assembly of France for Paris : June 1968 (He left his seat when he became a minister) / 1973–1986

Senator of Paris : 1986–1995

Couve de Murville's Government
The cabinet from 10 July 1968 – 20 June 1969
Maurice Couve de Murville – Prime Minister
Michel Debré – Minister of Foreign Affairs
Pierre Messmer – Minister of Armies
Raymond Marcellin – Minister of the Interior, Public Health, and Population
François-Xavier Ortoli – Minister of Economy and Finance
André Bettencourt – Minister of Industry
Joseph Fontanet – Minister of Labour, Employment, and Population
René Capitant – Minister of Justice
Edgar Faure – Minister of National Education
Henri Duvillard – Minister of Veterans and War Victims
André Malraux – Minister of Cultural Affairs
Robert Boulin – Minister of Agriculture
Albin Chalandon – Minister of Equipment and Housing
Jean Chamant – Minister of Transport
Roger Frey – Minister of Relations with Parliament
Yves Guéna – Minister of Posts and Telecommunications
Maurice Schumann – Minister of Social Affairs

On 28 April 1969 – Jean-Marcel Jeanneney succeeded Capitant as interim Minister of Justice.

References

External links
 

1907 births
1999 deaths
Politicians from Reims
French Protestants
Union for the New Republic politicians
Union of Democrats for the Republic politicians
Rally for the Republic politicians
Prime Ministers of France
French Foreign Ministers
French Ministers of Finance
Deputies of the 4th National Assembly of the French Fifth Republic
Deputies of the 5th National Assembly of the French Fifth Republic
Deputies of the 6th National Assembly of the French Fifth Republic
Deputies of the 7th National Assembly of the French Fifth Republic
French Senators of the Fifth Republic
Senators of Paris
French people of the Algerian War
Ambassadors of France to the United States
Ambassadors of France to West Germany
Ambassadors of France to Egypt
Permanent Representatives of France to NATO
Lycée Louis-le-Grand alumni
Sciences Po alumni
Order of the Francisque recipients
Grand Officiers of the Légion d'honneur
Burials at Montparnasse Cemetery